A cricket tournament, played as part of the 1900 Summer Olympics, took place on 19–20 August at the Vélodrome de Vincennes.  The only match of the tournament was played between teams representing Great Britain and France and was won by 158 runs by Great Britain. The team for the French club included at least 11 British nationals, two of whom were born in France, and it is considered a mixed team.

Originally, teams representing Belgium, France, Great Britain, and the Netherlands were scheduled to compete in a knockout tournament. 

After Belgium and the Netherlands withdrew, this left Great Britain to play France in a one-off match. Neither team was nationally selected: the British side was a touring club, the Devon and Somerset Wanderers (alias Devon County Wanderers), while the French team, the French Athletic Club Union, comprised mainly British expatriates living in Paris.

The two-day game commenced on 19 August 1900. Great Britain batted first and scored 117, and bowled France out for 78. Great Britain then scored 145 for 5 in their second innings and declared, setting the hosts a target of 185 to win. The tourists bowled out France for 26 to win the match by 158 runs, a significant margin, but with only five minutes of the match remaining. The Great Britain team was awarded silver medals and the French team bronze medals, together with miniature statues of the Eiffel Tower.

This was the only Olympiad where cricket was part of the official programme. All events which were restricted to amateurs, open to all nations, open to all competitors, and without handicapping, are now regarded as Olympic events (except for ballooning). The IOC has never decided which events were "Olympic" and which were not.

Background

Cricket had been scheduled as an event at the first modern Olympics, the 1896 Summer Olympics, being listed in the original programme for the Athens Games, but due to insufficient entries, the event was cancelled.

Four years later, at the Paris Games, there was also a shortage of entries: Belgium and the Netherlands withdrew from the cricket tournament. 

Their withdrawal left only Great Britain and the host nation, France, to participate.

The slightly haphazard nature of the cricket tournament was mirrored throughout the rest of the 1900 Olympics: events took place throughout a six-month period from May through until October, and like the Games themselves, were often considered part of the Exposition Universelle, a world's fair held in Paris from 15 April until 12 November 1900.

Team selection
Neither side was nationally selected, nor representative.  Great Britain, or England as they were called in the advertising handbills, were represented by a touring club side, the Devon and Somerset Wanderers. The side, formed by William Donne in 1894 for a tour of the Isle of Wight, had completed five other tours before travelling to France.  The Wanderers were primarily formed from players of Castle Cary Cricket Club, five of whom played in the match, and also included four former pupils of Blundell's School, a public school in Devon.  The side was completed by a number of players from the surrounding areas who were able to get away from business and personal commitments for the two-week period of the tour. Writing in the Journal of Olympic History, Ian Buchanan describes that both sides "were made up of distinctly average club cricketers". Only two members of the Wanderers side, and none of the French side, played first-class cricket.  Montagu Toller played six times for Somerset County Cricket Club, all in 1897, while Alfred Bowerman played for Somerset once in 1900, and again in 1905.

The French side was officially drawn from all the member clubs of the Union des Sociétés Françaises de Sports Athlétiques.  Few of these clubs actually sported cricket teams, and so the eventual side was selected from just two clubs: the Union Club and the Standard Athletic Club.  Both sides had strong English influences, and the majority of the team that competed for France in the Olympic match were British expatriates.  The Standard Athletic Club had been formed ten years earlier by English workers who had moved to the country to help build the Eiffel Tower.

Match

Summary

The match had been intended to be a standard eleven-a-side contest, but by mutual agreement from the captains this was increased to twelve-a-side, a move which the scorecard printers had not expected: extra names had to be added by hand.

Play commenced at 11:00AM on Sunday, 19 August, with the touring Wanderers batting first. They were bowled out for 117, with only four members of the team reaching double figures.  Frederick Cuming, one of the four Old Blundellians, top-scored for the side with 38, followed by their captain, and Exeter Cricket Club opening batsman, C. B. K. Beachcroft with 23.  The French were then bowled out for 78, the bowling led by Frederick Christian who claimed seven wickets. Play closed at 5:00PM after both sides had completed their first innings, and the Wanderers had a lead of 39 runs. The Wanderers batting improved the following morning, and they added 145 runs for the second innings, declaring their innings closed with five wickets down.  Beachcroft was again successful, reaching a half-century, a feat also achieved by Bowerman, who top-scored with 59 runs. 

The French required 185 runs to win, but lost their first ten wickets for eleven runs. At this point they attempted to play out time, which would have meant the match was drawn. The match was just five minutes from the end when their eleventh, and final, wicket fell, granting the Wanderers a 158-run victory. 

Toller was the pick of the Wanderers bowlers in the second innings, claiming seven wickets and conceding nine runs.

After the match, the English side were awarded silver medals, and the French side were given bronze medals, and both teams were also given miniature statues of the Eiffel Tower. The match was not covered in any national newspapers in England or France, although some of the local Devon and West Country newspapers did publish reports.

Scorecard

Scorecard notes
a.  The published total in the French Athletic Club Union's first innings is two more than the totals of the batsmen's runs and the extras.
b. Bowling details for overs, maidens and runs conceded are unavailable with the exception of runs conceded in the French Athletic Club Union's second innings, where some information has been recorded.

Aftermath
The Devon and Somerset Wanderers played two further matches during their tour of France, both one-day contests, and won them both. They were not impressed by the French, whom a journalist at the time described as "too excitable to enjoy the game".

Neither of the teams realised that they had competed in the Olympic Games, as the match had been advertised as part of the world's fair.  Although the IOC has never decided which events were "Olympic" and which were not, the medals won by the teams were later upgraded to gold for Great Britain and silver for France.  

A scheduled cricket competition at the 1904 Summer Olympics, held in St. Louis, was cancelled at short notice due to a lack of entries and facilities: the sport has not been included in the Olympic Games since.

As the match was 12-a-side, and scheduled for only two days, it does not have first-class status; despite this, it was the also only international cricket match played that year.

Medalists

See also
List of Olympic venues in discontinued events

Notes and references
References
 
 

Notes

External links

 www.icc-cricket.com
 Marylebone Cricket Club

 
Discontinued sports at the Summer Olympics